The year 2017 was the sixth year in the history of the Glory, an international kickboxing event. The year started with Glory 37: Los Angeles. The events were broadcasts through television agreements with ESPN and other regional channels around the world.

Glory 2017 Awards 
The following fighters won the GLORY Kickboxing year-end awards for 2017:
Glory Fighter of the Year 2017: Rico Verhoeven
Glory Fight of the Year 2017: Chenglong Zhang vs. Masaya Kubo
Glory Knockout of the Year 2017: Rico Verhoeven against Jamal Ben Saddik
Glory Knockout Kick of the Year 2017: Stoyan Koprivlenski against Maykol Yurk
Glory Upset of the Year 2017: Elvis Gashi against Josh Jauncey
Glory Newcomer of the Year 2017: Anissa Meksen
Glory Comeback of the Year 2017: Kevin Van Nostrand against Anvar Boynazarov

List of events

Glory 37: Los Angeles

Glory 37: Los Angeles was a kickboxing event held on January 20, 2017 at The Novo by Microsoft in Los Angeles, California, US.

Background
This event featured two world title fight for the Middleweight Championship between Jason Wilnis and Israel Adesanya as headliner, also the show featured 4-Man Welterweight Contender Tournament.

Robin van Roosmalen missed weight and was stripped of the Featherweight Championship. Only Embree has fought for the vacant Featherweight Championship.

Results

2017 Glory Welterweight Contender Tournament bracket

Glory 38: Chicago

Glory 38: Chicago was a kickboxing event held on February 24, 2017 at the Sears Centre in Hoffman Estates, Illinois, US.

Background
This event featured a world title fight for the Glory Light Heavyweight Championship between Artem Vakhitov and Saulo Cavalari as headliner, and 4-Man Light Heavyweight Contender Tournament to earn a title shot for the Glory Light Heavyweight Championship.

The Superfight Series was originally expected to be co-headlined by Cătălin Moroșanu and Chi Lewis-Parry. However, Lewis-Parry pulled out of the Fight, so Moroșanu faced Maurice Greene.

Zack Mwekassa was pulled from the tournament by the Illinois State Athletic Commission early on Friday morning for undisclosed medical issues and Zinedine Hameur-Lain faced Brian Collette.

Result

2017 Glory Light Heavyweight Contender Tournament bracket

Road to Glory UK 65 kg Tournament

Road to Glory UK 65 kg Tournament was a kickboxing event held on March 11, 2017 at the Grantham Meres Leisure Centre in Grantham, England.

Results

Glory 39: Brussels

Glory 39: Brussels was a kickboxing event held on March 25, 2017 at the Vorst National in Brussels, Belgium.

Background
This event featured two world title fight for the Glory Welterweight Championship between Cedric Doumbe and Yoann Kongolo as Glory 39 headliner, for the Glory Lightweight Championship between Sitthichai Sitsongpeenong and Dylan Salvadoras Superfight Series headliner Also this event featured 4-Man Featherweight Contender Tournament.

Hysni Beqiri had to withdraw from Glory 39, because of an injury in a car accident. Anton Petrov filled in for Beqiri against Marat Grigorian.

French veteran Karim Benmansour no longer competed at Glory 39 as he required additional time off to recover from surgery. Therefore, Harut Grigorian faced a new opponent, Pavol Garaj.

Due to visa issue, Anvar Boynazarov no longer competed in the Glory 39 featherweight contender tournament. His slot was filled by Nafi Bilalovski.

Chi Lewis-Parry had to withdraw due to illness, the fight with Hesdy Gerges was off.

Results

2017 Glory Featherweight Contender Tournament bracket

Glory 40: Copenhagen

Glory 40: Copenhagen was a kickboxing event held on April 29, 2017 at the Forum Copenhagen in Copenhagen, Denmark.

Background
This event featured a world title fight for the Glory Middleweight Championship between Jason Wilnis and Simon Marcus as headliner, and 4-Man Middleweight Contender Tournament to earn a title shot for the Glory Middleweight Championship.

Fight Card

2017 Glory Middleweight Contender Tournament bracket

Glory 41: Holland

Glory 41: Holland was a kickboxing event held on May 20, 2017 at the Brabanthallen in Den Bosch, Netherlands.

Background
Bonus awards:
 
The following fighters were awarded $5,000 bonuses:
Fighter of the Night: Petchpanomrung Kiatmookao
Knockout of the Night: D'Angelo Marshall

Results

2017 Glory Heavyweight Contender Tournament bracket

Glory 42: Paris

Glory 42: Paris was a kickboxing event held on June 10, 2017 at the AccorHotels Arena in Paris, France.

Background
Bonus awards:
 
The following fighters were awarded $5,000 bonuses:
Fighter of the Night: Yoann Kongolo
Knockout of the Night: Massaro Glunder

Results

2017 Glory Lightweight Contender Tournament bracket

Glory 43: New York

Glory 43: New York was a kickboxing event held on July 14, 2017 at The Theater at Madison Square Garden in New York City, New York, US.

Background
This event featured a fight between No. 1 heavyweight contender Benjamin Adegbuyi and Guto Inocente as headliner, and a light heavyweight pairing between Pavel Zhuravlev and Saulo Cavalari For the Interim Glory Light Heavyweight Championship as Superfight Series headliner.

This event also featured a 4-Man Featherweight Contender Tournament to earn a shot at the Glory Featherweight Championship.

Bonus awards:
 
The following fighters were awarded $5,000 bonuses:
Fighter of the Night: Elvis Gashi
Knockout of the Night: Chenchen Li

Results

2017 Glory Featherweight Contender Tournament 2 bracket

Glory 44: Chicago

Glory 44: Chicago was a kickboxing event held on August 25, 2017 at the Sears Centre in Hoffman Estates, Illinois, US.

Background
This event features the rematch between Cedric Doumbe and Murthel Groenhart for the Glory Welterweight Championship as Glory 44: Chicago headliner, and a Women's Super Bantamweight pairing between Tiffany van Soest and Funda Alkayis for the Glory Women's Super Bantamweight Championship as Superfight Series headliner as well as Cătălin Moroșanu looking to have yet another crazy brawl. Also on the fight card is Chicago-native Richard Abraham against Daniel Morales.

This event also features a 4-Man Welterweight Contender Tournament to earn a shot at the Glory Welterweight Championship.

Bonus awards:
 
The following fighters will be awarded $5,000 bonuses:
Fighter of the Night: Harut Grigorian
Knockout of the Night: Robert Thomas

Fight card

2017 Glory Welterweight Contender Tournament 2 bracket

Glory 45: Amsterdam

Glory 45: Amsterdam was a kickboxing event held on September 30, 2017 at the Sporthallen Zuid in Amsterdam, Netherlands.

Background
This event features a fight between Robin van Roosmalen and Serhiy Adamchuk for the Glory Featherweight Championship as Glory 45: Amsterdam headliner, and a Welterweight pairing between Nieky Holzken and Yoann Kongolo as co-headliner. Heavyweights Hesdy Gerges and Mladen Brestovac headline the SuperFight Series.

This event also features a 4-Man Light Heavyweight Contender Tournament to earn a shot at the Glory Light Heavyweight Championship.

An injury suffered during training has forced former welterweight champion Nieky Holzken out of the bout against Alim Nabiev.

Bonus awards:
 
The following fighters will be awarded $5,000 bonuses:
Fighter of the Night: Michael Duut
Knockout of the Night: Mladen Brestovac

Fight card

2017 Light Heavyweight Contender Tournament 2 bracket

Road to Glory UK 70 kg Tournament

Road to Glory UK 70 kg Tournament was a kickboxing event held on October 7, 2017 at the Grantham Meres Leisure Centre in Grantham, England.

Results

Glory 46: China

Glory 46: China was a kickboxing event held on October 14, 2017 at the Guangzhou Gymnasium in Guangzhou, China.

Background

Bonus awards:
 
The following fighters will be awarded $5,000 bonuses:
Fighter of the Night: Chenglong Zhang
Knockout of the Night: Masaya Kubo

Fight card

2017 Featherweight Qualification Tournament bracket

Glory 47: Lyon

Glory 47: Lyon was a kickboxing event held on October 28, 2017 at the Palais des Sports de Gerland in Lyon, France.

Background

Bonus awards:
 
The following fighters were awarded $5,000 bonuses:
Fighter of the Night: Abdellah Ezbiri
Knockout of the Night: Anvar Boynazarov

Results

2017 Featherweight Contender Tournament 3 bracket

Glory 48: New York

Glory 48: New York was a kickboxing event held on December 1, 2017 at The Theater at Madison Square Garden in New York City, New York, US.

Background

Bonus awards:
 
The following fighters were awarded $5,000 bonuses:
Fighter of the Night: Robert Thomas
Knockout of the Night: Kevin Vannostrand

Results

2017 Middleweight Qualification Tournament bracket

Glory 49: Rotterdam

Glory 49: Rotterdam was a kickboxing event held on December 9, 2017 at Rotterdam Ahoy in Rotterdam, Netherlands.

Background

Bonus awards:
 
The following fighters will be awarded $5,000 bonuses:
Fighter of the Night:
Knockout of the Night:

Results

2017 Glory Lightweight Contender Tournament 2 bracket

See also
2017 in Kunlun Fight
2017 in Glory of Heroes 
2017 in Wu Lin Feng

References

Glory (kickboxing) events
2017 in kickboxing